Vancouver Whitecaps Football Club is a Canadian professional soccer club based in Vancouver. They compete in Major League Soccer (MLS) as a member club of the league's Western Conference. The MLS iteration of the club was established on March 18, 2009, and began play in 2011 as the 17th team to enter Major League Soccer while replacing the USSF Division 2 team of the same name in the city, making them a phoenix club and the third to carry the Whitecaps name. The club has been owned and managed by the same group since their USSF days.

In the 2012 season, the team became the first Canadian team to qualify for the MLS Cup Playoffs. The Whitecaps have won two Canadian Championships, in 2015 and 2022. Vancouver also competes against longtime Pacific Northwest rivals Seattle and Portland in the Cascadia Cup, a fan-created trophy awarded based on MLS regular season results. Notable former Whitecaps players include former American international Jay DeMerit, the club's first player and captain; Camilo Sanvezzo, the 2013 MLS Golden Boot winner; and current Canadian international Alphonso Davies, a homegrown player.

History 

An ownership group in Vancouver were granted the seventeenth Major League Soccer franchise on March 18, 2009, by MLS Commissioner Don Garber.
While no name was provided at the Vancouver announcement, over a year later the club confirmed it would keep the Whitecaps name. The team sold the first 5,000 season ticket deposits 48 hours after they became available to the public. Remaining season tickets were made available to season ticket holders for the USSF 2 Whitecaps before becoming available to non-season ticket holders.

In preparation for its first MLS season, the Whitecaps brought in executive talent from around the world. On November 24, 2009, Paul Barber, former Tottenham Hotspur F.C. executive, was announced to join the club as CEO. Others joining him included former D.C. United head coach Tom Soehn as Director of Operations and Dutch national Richard Grootscholten as the Technical Director and head coach of the residency program.

As the head coach of the USL and later USSF Division 2 Vancouver Whitecaps, former Iceland international Teitur Thordarson was confirmed as head coach on September 2, 2010, for the inaugural MLS season. He was subsequently relieved of his duties on May 30, 2011, after the Whitecaps won just one of their first twelve matches. Tom Soehn, the Whitecaps director of soccer operations, replaced Thordarson on an interim basis.

The Whitecaps began play in the 2011 MLS season with their first match on March 19, 2011, against rival Canadians Toronto FC, which they won 4–2. The first goal in the Whitecaps' MLS era was scored by Eric Hassli. After their winning start the Whitecaps struggled, and failed to secure another victory in their next 11 MLS games, drawing six and losing five. In the aftermath of their 1–1 draw with the New York Red Bulls on May 30 head coach Teitur Thordarson was fired. Tom Soehn took over coaching duties for the remainder of the 2011 season, while Martin Rennie was announced as the new permanent head coach on August 9, taking over officially on November 2. The team managed to attract 15,500 season ticket holders in its first MLS season and 13,000 for the second.

On March 3, 2012, the Whitecaps won their first minor, pre-season cup at the 2012 Walt Disney World Pro Soccer Classic defeating Toronto FC 1–0 thanks to a goal by Camilo Sanvezzo. The Whitecaps finished the regular season with 11 wins, 3 losses, and 10 ties positioning the club, fifth in the Western Conference and 11th on the league overall table. On October 21, 2012, the Whitecaps became the first Canadian team to earn a spot in the MLS playoffs. Vancouver were eliminated in the knockout round.

In the 2013 season, Vancouver finished in seventh in the Western Conference, 13th in the league table with 13 wins, 12 losses, and 9 ties in the regular season. They were not able to qualify for the post season, in the playoffs as they had accomplished in the season prior. Two days after the end of the 2013 MLS regular season, Rennie's contract was not renewed sparking a search for the next head coach. In their off-season, the Whitecaps were in the midst of controversy with one of their then players, Camilo, who had played for the team since their inaugural campaign, after the Brazilian went on to join Liga MX club Querétaro.  The Mexican club believed that he was no longer under contract, while the Whitecaps reported that he was still on a contract with Vancouver. The scandal was resolved with the Liga MX club paying a transfer fee from Vancouver to acquire the Brazilian forward.

In October 2014, the Whitecaps qualified for the 2015–16 CONCACAF Champions League for the very first time as a result of becoming the highest ranked Canadian team in the 2014 MLS season and due to a reformatting of the Canadian Championship in the following season. A week later they qualified for the MLS playoffs for the second time, an achievement unmatched by any Canadian team.

Colours and badge 

On June 8, 2010, it was officially announced the club would continue using the "Whitecaps" name, but with a redesigned logo. The name alludes to the geographic features surrounding the city: snow-capped mountains to the north and the Pacific Ocean's white-capped waves to the west.

The official club colours include navy blue ("deep sea"), white, and light blue ("Whitecaps blue"). The "deep sea" blue represents the maritime landscape of the Vancouver area and the "Whitecaps blue" indicates the reflection of the North Shore Mountains in the Pacific Ocean. The lighter shade of blue also alludes to the primary colour of the original Whitecaps, winners of Soccer Bowl 1979. The silver outline pays homage to the team's championship victories since 1974.

On June 10, 2010, the Whitecaps strip package was unveiled with Bell Canada serving as the inaugural jersey sponsor. The home shirt is white with horizontal, navy blue pinstripes; the stripes broaden slightly from bottom to top. The secondary shirt is deep blue with an embossed, interlocking diamond pattern which is also deep blue and is reflective in the light.

On June 14, 2012, the Whitecaps unveiled a third kit. The third kit is predominantly "arbutus brown", with sky blue accents, which reflects the unique land full of deep roots and the high-reaching arms of the temperate rainforests of British Columbia.

In 2019 they used a redesigned version of their 1979 kit as a 40th anniversary tribute to the team winning the 1979 NASL Soccer Bowl.

Kit history 

Home, away, and third kits.

 Home

 Away

 Third

Sponsorship

Stadium 

The Whitecaps plays its home matches at BC Place in Vancouver, which it shares with the BC Lions of the Canadian Football League. Vancouver has played at BC Place since the final month of the 2011 MLS season, having spent the majority of that year at Empire Field.

BC Place is a 54,500-seat multi-purpose stadium designed for both Canadian football and soccer. The stadium opened in 1983, but underwent a complete two-phase revitalization project between 2009 and 2011. The stadium now features the largest cable-supported retractable roof in the world and polytan artificial turf, which is certified by FIFA with a 2-star rating. The Whitecaps reduce the stadium's capacity to 22,120 for matches by using white sails (known as the "secondary roof") to close off the upper bowl. Club ownership initially hoped to build Whitecaps Waterfront Stadium in Gastown in time for the 2016 season, but the club has committed to BC Place in light of stadium opposition.

The club played most of its inaugural season at Empire Field, a temporary stadium built at the former site of Empire Stadium to house the Whitecaps and the BC Lions while BC Place was being renovated. Empire Field was a 27,500-seat multi-purpose stadium that featured FIFA 1-star rated FieldTurf. The team played its final match at Empire Field on September 24, 2011, a 3–1 loss to Seattle Sounders FC. The following week, the Whitecaps played their first match at BC Place, a 1–0 loss to Portland Timbers on October 2, 2011.

The club does not have a permanent training facility, opting instead to use facilities around Greater Vancouver. However, the club partnered with the Government of British Columbia and the University of British Columbia (UBC) to build a $32.5 million National Soccer Development Centre on the UBC campus, which opened on September 22, 2017.

Near the end of the 2020 and at the beginning of the 2021 seasons, the club was forced to play their home matches in the United States due to the Canadian government's response to limit cross-border travel during the COVID-19 pandemic. The club shared facilities with Portland Timbers Providence Park in Portland, Oregon where they played one of their rivalry matches as the home team. In 2021, the club played most of their home matches at Rio Tinto Stadium in Sandy, Utah since the start of the season.

Club culture

Supporters 

The largest Whitecaps supporters group is known as the Southsiders. The group began in 1999 when fans of the Vancouver 86ers began congregating in the pitch-level beer garden behind the goal at the south end of Swangard Stadium.

The Southsiders' relationship with the team's ownership has not always been amicable, but improved since the announcement of an MLS expansion team. Images of the Southsiders are featured prominently in Whitecaps' marketing campaigns and the group's board was invited to the invite-only launch of the kits and logo to be used in MLS. The expansion has also increased membership to over 1200 and 100 paid members by July 2010. Southsider supporters were primarily located in the southeast corner (sections 249–254) of BC Place stadium; the majority of the group later relocated to the new general admission section at BC Place in half of section 253 and all of section 254 that was introduced for the 2020 MLS season.

The three biggest supporter groups are the Vancouver Southhsiders, Curva Collective and the Rain City Brigade. There are several sub-groups that have emerged, members of which are sometimes also members of the three larger groups. Founded after the 2011 season, Curva Collective focuses on visual displays and was previously located in the southwest "curve" in sections 203 and 204 at BC Place. Rain City Brigade was established in 2010, occupying part of Section 201 and marching on matchdays from Library Square.

The Whitecaps are also home to North America's first ever all youth supporter group, Vancouver Albion. They stand in section 254, and have become one the 'Caps biggest groups with over 100 members. The Prawnsiders have existed since the Whitecaps' Swangard years, but organized formally at the beginning of the inaugural MLS season in 2011. The name "Prawnsiders" comes from "prawn-sandwich brigade", a term often used to describe soccer supporters who sit in the more expensive seats. They are primarily located in sections 244 and 245. South Sisters provide a positive meeting space for Vancouver Whitecaps supporters who identify as female, LGBTQ2+, or allies. The group was officially formed in 2019. Couch Ultras, named for their origins as a home-based group, organizes tifo displays at BC Place for the Whitecaps and Canadian national teams.

In 2020, a new general admissions supporters section (named the Village Stand) was introduced in half of Section 253 and all of Section 254, adjacent to the tunnel where the players enter the pitch. Membership in a supporters group is not required and seating is unassigned. The majority of the Vancouver Southsiders and Curva Collective are located here. Standing and chanting are permitted throughout the match in this' section.

Mascot 

The official mascot for the Whitecaps is Spike, a Belted kingfisher, a bird common to the Vancouver area.

Rivalries

Cascadia Cup 

The Vancouver Whitecaps have longstanding rivalries with both the Portland Timbers and Seattle Sounders FC. The rivalries predate MLS and have been an integral part of the soccer culture in the Pacific Northwest. Matches between these three teams are arguably the most passionate in all of MLS as each of these teams are well-supported by their respective cities.

Portland Timbers

The Portland Timbers are one of the Whitecaps' biggest and longtime rivals, with an antagonistic history between the clubs going back to 1975 in the original North American Soccer League. In the A-League and USL First Division Portland and Vancouver clashed in crucial, and often physical matches during the late 2000s, with the clubs facing each other in memorable playoff duels in 2007, 2009, and 2010. The two clubs played for the 100th time in 2017, and the rivalry is one of the most-played in US soccer history.

Seattle Sounders

Canadian rivalries 

The Vancouver Whitecaps also have rivalries with Toronto FC and the CF Montreal. Vancouver's first game in MLS was against Toronto in an attempt by the league to spur a rivalry between the two Canadian teams. Montreal was a rival in the second division. The three teams have played each other during Voyageurs Cup competitions.

Broadcasting 

All Whitecaps matches are broadcast on television and radio. Through the 2013 season, Sportsnet Pacific and Sportsnet One nationally broadcast all "regional" Whitecaps games not televised by TSN or TSN2 as part of its national package of MLS games, broadcasting 24 games per season. Regional matches were called by Craig MacEwen, who does play-by-play, and former Vancouver 86ers goalkeeper Paul Dolan, who provides colour commentary. Dolan replaced former Vancouver Whitecaps midfielder Martin Nash, who provided colour commentary during the Whitecaps FC inaugural season. In January 2014, TSN (which is owned by Bell Media, a subsidiary of the Whitecaps' founding sponsor Bell Canada) announced that it would take over broadcast rights to these "regional" Whitecaps games beginning in the 2014 Major League Soccer season. In 2014, selected games aired on CIVT-DT and CIVI-DT due to scheduling conflicts. As of 2021, TSN streams all 34 regular season games, with playoff games if qualified. The current broadcasting team features Blake Price doing play-by-play, and Dolan as colour commentator, after Peter Schaad was relieved of his play-by-play duty in April 2021.

On radio, Whitecaps games are primarily broadcast on AM 730 with Asa Rehman  and Colin Miller. Until the end of the 2016 season, matches broadcast on radio has play-by-play duties shared between Schaad and Scott Rintoul, and by former Vancouver Whitecaps midfielder David Norman, who provides colour commentary. Norman replaced Paul Dolan prior to the 2012 MLS season, after Dolan joined the Sportsnet broadcasting team.

Ownership 

Vancouver Whitecaps FC is owned by a group of four investors: Greg Kerfoot, Steve Luczo, Jeff Mallett, and Steve Nash. The group has a collective net worth over $2 billion. Kerfoot has been the majority owner of the Whitecaps since 2002, when he saved the club from contraction after previous owner David Stadnyk left the club, selling it to United Soccer Leagues. Mallett, a former chief operating officer (COO) of Yahoo!, who was raised in Victoria, British Columbia, and played for several collegiate soccer teams. He later purchased minority stakes in the San Francisco Giants of Major League Baseball and English soccer club Derby County F.C. Having first met at a charity soccer event in 2005, Mallett partnered with Steve Nash—a two-time National Basketball Association (NBA) Most Valuable Player who was also raised in Victoria—to put together a bid for a minority share of English soccer club Tottenham Hotspur F.C. in 2008. After that transaction fell through, the duo contacted Kerfoot about a minority stake in the club. Nash is the older brother of former Whitecaps midfielder Martin Nash. The fourth partner, Steve Luczo, is the president, chairman, and CEO of Seagate Technology and a partner in Boston Basketball Partners L.L.C., a group who own the NBA Boston Celtics. Luczo met Kerfoot while the two were both employed by Seagate Technology, and Kerfoot contacted Luczo proposing he become part of the club's MLS bid. In 2009, the group paid a $35 million expansion fee to MLS for the right to join the league.

Current players and staff 

 For details on former players, see All-time Vancouver Whitecaps FC roster.

Roster

Out on loan

Technical staff

Management

Former players and staff

Head coaches

Club captains

Affiliated teams

Whitecaps FC 2 

Whitecaps FC 2 was the farm club of the Vancouver Whitecaps that was established on November 21, 2014. Whitecaps FC 2 began competing in the 2015 season, in the USL. On November 27, 2017, the Whitecaps dissolved their reserve side in favour of affiliating with 2018 expansion club Fresno FC. A new reserve team, also named Whitecaps FC 2, joined the newly established MLS Next Pro league in 2022.

Whitecaps Women

The Whitecaps organization owned and operated a women's team in the USL W-League from 2001 to 2012 that played at Swangard Stadium. Originally named the Vancouver Breakers, the club was renamed the Whitecaps in 2003 under the ownership of Greg Kerfoot. The team won the W-League championship twice (in 2004 and 2006) and finished as runners-up in 2010. In its place, the Whitecaps launched an EXCEL youth development program for girls in partnership with B.C. Soccer and Canada Soccer.

In 2019, several former Whitecaps Women players published allegations of sexual abuse and misconduct from coaches at the club. The claims centered around behaviour by head coach Bob Birarda, who was fired in 2008 after an internal investigation, and Hubert Busby Jr., who coached the team from 2011 to 2012. Several supporters groups for the men's team organized protests and walk-outs during matches in April and May 2019 in support of an independent investigation into the allegations. At one protest in May, they were joined by visiting Portland Timbers fans.

In late 2021, MLS announced an independent investigation and review into the conduct of both coaches as well as the Whitecaps organization. The investigation found that the Whitecaps' response "was appropriate" and "adhered to all of the [internal] investigator's recommendations". A parallel investigation into Canada Soccer's actions found that the allegations of Birarda's behaviour with the under-20 team were "mishandled" by CSA.

Whitecaps FC Academy

Whitecaps FC Academy, formerly known as the Whitecaps Residency program, is the youth academy and development system of Vancouver Whitecaps FC that was established in 2007. The academy fields men's and women's teams in League1 British Columbia, which commenced in 2022.

Honours

Major
 Canadian Championship
 Winners (2): 2015, 2022
 Runners-up (5): 2011, 2012, 2014, 2016, 2018

Minor
 Cascadia Cup
 Winners (3): 2013, 2014, 2016

Team records

Year-by-year 

This is a partial list of the last five seasons completed by the Whitecaps. For the full season-by-season history, see List of Vancouver Whitecaps FC seasons. For a historical list encompassing results from the previous two incarnations of the club, see History of Vancouver Whitecaps FC.

International tournaments

CONCACAF Champions League 

Vancouver has qualified for the CONCACAF Champions League three times, the first in the 2015–16 edition of the tournament.

Other competitions 
 2011 World Football Challenge

 Group stage v.  Manchester City – 1–2

Player records and awards

Golden Boot 

Note: Only MLS regular season goals counted

Most appearances

Top goalscorers

Other records 

 Appearances: Russell Teibert (187)
 Goals: Camilo (39)
 Assists: Pedro Morales (22)
 Hat tricks
 Kekuta Manneh v Seattle Sounders FC October 9, 2013
 Camilo v Colorado Rapids October 27, 2013
 Cristian Techera v New England Revolution May 26, 2018
 Brian White v San Jose Earthquakes October 2, 2021
 Wins: David Ousted (55)
 Shutouts (clean sheets): David Ousted (42)

Player of the year

Footnotes

References

External links 

 

 
Major League Soccer teams
Major League Soccer teams based in Canada
Association football clubs established in 2009
2009 establishments in British Columbia
Soccer clubs in Vancouver
Expatriated football clubs
Phoenix clubs (association football)